Kololo is a hill in Kampala, the largest city and capital of Uganda. The name also applies to the upscale residential and commercial neighbourhood that sits on that hill.

Location
Kololo is close to the centre of Kampala, bordered by Naguru to the east, Bukoto to the north, Mulago to the north-west, Makerere to the west, Nakasero to the south-west, and Kibuli to the south. Kololo is in the Kampala Central Division. The coordinates of Kololo are 0°19'46.0"N, 32°35'41.0"E (Latitude:0.329445; Longitude:32.594725).

Overview
Kololo gets its name from the 19th century Acholi Chief Awich, from Northern Uganda. He, along with Kabalega of Bunyoro resisted British rule. Awich was arrested and brought to Kampala and incarcerated on top of Kololo Hill. He is alleged to have cried out in Luo, “An atye kany kololo”, which means “I am here alone.” Awich was lamenting over the fact that he had been left alone in the wilderness, miles away from home. His captors and the Baganda started calling the location and the hill "Kololo", resulting in its name today.

Since the 1950s, before Uganda's Independence, Kololo has been an upscale residential area because of its central location in the city and to the views from the hill. Kololo is a popular location for diplomatic missions to Uganda, housing more than a dozen embassies and ambassadors' residences.

During the 2000s, hotels, banks, hospitals, and other corporate entities began to infiltrate the hill, mainly to serve those who reside there, away from the noise and traffic congestion in the central business district located on the neighbouring  Nakasero Hill.

However, the introduction of business premises on Kololo Hill, especially restaurants and bars, has increased noise and has introduced heavy traffic that interferes with the serenity and ambiance that was there before. Several irritated residents have jointly sued seven bars, accusing them of being the source of noise pollution. As of February 2019, the case was still winding through Uganda's court system.

Points of interest

The following points of interest are found on Kololo hill:

 Acacia Mall
 7 Hills International School
 Arya Sumaj School
 Casino Simba
 Centenary Park
 Hotel Africana
 Dr. Stockley's Hospital
 East Kololo Primary School
 Embassy of Algeria
 Embassy of the People's Republic of China
 Embassy of the Democratic Republic of the Congo
 Embassy of Egypt
 Embassy of Germany
 Embassy of Sweden
 Embassy of Norway
 Embassy of Libya
 Embassy of North Korea
 Embassy of Russia
 Embassy of Rwanda
 Embassy of Saudi Arabia
 Embassy of South Africa
 High Commission of the Republic of Kenya
 Jinja Road Police Station
 Kampala Christian Cemetery
 Kampala Golf Course
 Kampala Hospital
 Kololo Airstrip
 Kitante Hill Secondary School
 Kololo High School 
 Kololo Senior Secondary School
 Kololo Hospital
 "Uganda Sickle Cell Rescue Foundation"
 Lincoln International School
 Medipal International Hospital
 Speke Apartments
 Uganda Management Institute
 Uganda National Museum
 Java House 
 French School 
 MTN Sports Arena Lugogo
 Torino Bar and Restaurant

Photos
Photo of Kololo Hill

See also
 Kabalagala
 Muyenga
 Mengo

References

External links
About Kololo

Neighborhoods of Kampala
Kampala Central Division